Carmine Lawrence Gentile is a member of the Massachusetts House of Representatives who was sworn in January 2015. A resident of Sudbury, Massachusetts, he was elected as a Democrat to represent the 13th Middlesex district. Gentile is a private-practice attorney who held several positions in city government before being elected to the House.

See also
 2019–2020 Massachusetts legislature
 2021–2022 Massachusetts legislature

References

Democratic Party members of the Massachusetts House of Representatives
People from Sudbury, Massachusetts
Living people
21st-century American politicians
Year of birth missing (living people)